Ōeyama, Ooeyama or Mount Ooe may refer to:

 Ōeyama (mountain range) (大江山), a mountain range in Kyoto Prefecture, Japan
 Ōeyama (mountain) (大枝山), a mountain in Kyoto Prefecture, Japan

See also
 Ooe (disambiguation)